Ali V Ben Ahmed, nicknamed Ali Khodja, or Ali Loco (the mad) (Arabic: علي ابن أحمد خوجة) was of Georgian (Mingrelian) origins as well as Native Algerian origins born in modern day Algeria. He was the dey of the Deylik of Algiers from September 1817, just after the assassination of his predecessor Omar Agha the 8th. He remained so until his death in February 1818.

Origins 
His mother was an Algerian Kabyle, most likely from the Zwawa tribal confederation. His father was  Mingrelian.

Early life 
He was complicit in the assassination of Ahmed bin Ali Khodja in 1808, and the assassination of Omar agha (1817). He served in various important positions before being elected Dey in 1817.

Rule 
A few days after his arrival, and to better ensure his safety, he left the Palace of the Djenina located in the lower part of the city of Casbah and offering small defences, to move to the fortress of the Casbah where he put the treasury safe.

Using his connections to the Kabyles, he signed an alliance with the Zwawas, and the Kouloughlis.

After they attempted to rebel against his rule he at one point had more than 1,500 Turkish janissaries executed.

Death 
He died of the plague on February 28, 1818.

After his death in 1818, he was buried in the Thaalibia Cemetery of the Casbah of Algiers.

References 

Deys of Algiers
People from Constantine, Algeria
18th-century births
1818 deaths
19th-century deaths from plague (disease)
Georgians from the Ottoman Empire
Infectious disease deaths in Algeria